The Thoubal district of Manipur state in India has two subdivisions. At the time of the 2011 Census of India, the Kakching district (split in 2016) was a part of the Thoubal district.

Subdivisions 

The Thoubal district has two subdivisions with six tehsils or circles:

 Lilong subdivision: Irong  Chesaba and Lilong
 Thoubal subdivision: Thoubal, Yairipok, Heirok, and Khongjom

It has three community development blocks (CD blocks) with 27 gram panchayats:

 Lilong
 Khekman
 Maibam Uchiwa
 Oinam Sawombung
 Turen Ahanbi
 Charangpat
 Wangkhem
 Thoubal
 Leisangthem
 Moijing
 Khangabok Part I
 Khangabok Part II
 Khangabok Part III
 Wangbal
 Sangaiyumpham I
 Sangaiyumpham II
 Wangjing Tentha
 Heirok Part I
 Heirok Part II
 Heirok Part III
 Langathel
 Kangyambem
 Salungpham
 Sapam
 Samaram
 Tekcham
 Leirongthel Ningel
 Lourembam
 Tentha

Towns 

The Thoubal district has 6 municipal councils: at the time of the 2011 census, Wangjing Lamding Municipal Council did not exist, and four others (those except Thoubal) were classified as Nagar Panchayats.

Villages 

The villages in the Thoubal district include:

Lilong subdivision

Irong  Chesaba SDC Circle

Lilong SDC Circle 

The following village is not listed in the 2011 census directory: Kayam Siphai.

Thoubal subdivision

Thoubal SDC circle 

The following villages are not listed in the 2011 census directory:

 Yaithibi
 Haokha Maning
 Haokha Mamang
 Sabaltongba
 Okram Hanjaba
 Nongangkhong
 Okram Wangmataba
 Thoubal Wangmataba
 Thoubal Achouba
 Kshetrileikai
 Athokpam
 Phoudel

Khongjom SDC circle

Heirok SDC Circle

Yairipok SDC Circle 

The following villages are not listed in the 2011 census directory:

 Keirambi
 Bishnunaha
 Bamon Lekai
 Kekru
 Sekmaikumbi
 Shikhong
 Ukhongsang

Other 

The following villages of Thoubal block, listed in the 2011 census, no longer appear on the district website:

References 

Thoubal